Denyce Graves (born March 7, 1964) is an American mezzo-soprano opera singer.

Early life
Graves was born on March 7, 1964, in Washington, D.C., to Charles Graves and Dorothy (Middleton) Graves-Kenner. She is the middle of three children and was raised by her mother on Galveston Street, S.W., in the Bellevue section of Washington. She graduated from the Duke Ellington School of the Arts in 1981. Graves studied voice at the Oberlin Conservatory of Music and the New England Conservatory with Helen Hodam. She worked at the Wolf Trap Opera Company, which provides further training and experience for young singers who are between their academic training and full-time professional careers. Soon after, she was invited by David Gockley to participate in the Houston Opera Studio, from 1988 to 1990, where she studied with Elena Nikolaidi.

Career

She made her debut at the Metropolitan Opera in 1995 and has appeared at many opera houses. Though her repertoire is extensive, her signature parts are the title roles in Carmen and Samson et Dalila. Graves also made many appearances on the children's television series, Between the Lions, where she used her talents to teach children sounds of words. On January 20, 2005, she sang the patriotic song "American Anthem" during the 55th Presidential Inauguration, between the swearing-in ceremonies of Vice President Dick Cheney and President George W. Bush for their second terms in office.

Graves sang "America the Beautiful" and "The Lord's Prayer" at the Washington National Cathedral during a memorial service for the victims of 9/11 on September 14, 2001, attended by President Bush, members of Congress, other politicians and representatives of foreign governments.

In 2003, Graves performed in front of a live audience at the Mann Center for the Performing Arts in Philadelphia for a television special, Denyce Graves: Breaking the Rules. In 2005, she hosted the radio show Voce di Donna (Voice of a Lady) on Vox!, the vocal classical music channel of XM Satellite Radio, on which she interviewed various opera singers. Graves often was heard on The Tony Kornheiser Show radio program with her rendition of the "Mailbag Theme".

In 2005, she sang the lead role in the world premiere of Margaret Garner, an opera by Richard Danielpour and Toni Morrison.

In May 2010, Graves performed a concert with tenor Lawrence Brownlee in the United States Supreme Court Building for the Supreme Court justices.

On June 15, 2013, Graves sang in the world premiere of Terence Blanchard's and Michael Cristofer's boxing opera, Champion with the Opera Theatre of Saint Louis.

In 2014, a recording of We Shall Overcome arranged by composer Nolan Williams, Jr. and featuring Graves was among several works of art, including the poem A Brave and Startling Truth by Maya Angelou, sent to space on the first test flight of the spacecraft Orion.

On September 25, 2020, Graves sang at the US Capitol as her friend Ruth Bader Ginsburg's casket was lying in state. Ginsburg was a devoted fan of opera.

On November 22, 2022, she sang the role of Sally in the stage premiere of Kevin Puts's opera The Hours at the Metropolitan Opera. The performance of December 10 was video-cast as part of the Metropolitan Opera Live in HD series.

Personal life
First husband (1990-2006) - David Perry (born 1950), a classical guitarist and operatic singer who also became her business partner. 
Daughter Ella (born 2004)
Second husband (since September 2009) - Robert Montgomery, transplant surgeon.

Recognition
In 2017, Graves was honored by The Washington Performing Arts with the Ambassador of the Arts Award.

In 2019, Graves received the Golden Plate Award of the American Academy of Achievement presented by Awards Council member Dr. Ben Carson.

References

External links

 (archived)

Interview with Denyce Graves, August 7, 1997

1964 births
20th-century African-American women singers
21st-century African-American women singers
American operatic mezzo-sopranos
Living people
New England Conservatory alumni
Oberlin Conservatory of Music alumni
People from Bethesda, Maryland
Singers from Maryland
Singers from Washington, D.C.
Classical musicians from Washington, D.C.
Voice teachers
Women music educators
People from Bellevue (Washington, D.C.)
African-American women opera singers